The Sinpo-class submarine, also called the Gorae-class ("whale") or Pongdae-class, is a new class of submarine produced in North Korea. Only one submarine has been observed in service, the 8.24Yongung. It is the largest submarine designed and built for the Korean People's Navy.

Design and features
The design may be influenced by older Yugoslavian designs such as Heroj and Sava. There has been speculation the design is influenced by modern Russian submarines of the Kilo class, or the Golf class submarine, but the submarine is significantly smaller than these designs.

If the design is successful, the Sinpo class could replace the aging Romeo-class submarines. However it is possibly a one-off experimental submarine as the Korean People's Navy has built previously.

Armaments
Satellite images suggest the presence of an opening on the conning tower indicating the presence of a launch tube for one or two missiles.

In August 2016, during the annual joint US-South Korea military exercise, a submarine presumed to be this one launched what is believed to be a KN-11 ballistic missile into the Sea of Japan. North Korea's first released pictures of the submarine associated it with the test of the KN-11 missile.

8.24 Yongung
The only submarine of this class is named 8.24Yongung ("August 24 Hero"), with pennant number 824, named after the DPRK's first successfully launched submarine-launched ballistic missile from a submarine on 24August 2016.

On 19October 2021, the 8.24 Hero Sinpo/Gorae submarine conducted a launch of an SLBM apparently based on the KN-23 missile. ON 14 March 2023, two cruise missiles were fired as part of a launching drill.

Variants

Sinpo-C
In September 2016, analysts at 38 North reported on a 10-metre diameter object detected on satellite images of North Korea's Sinpo South Shipyard, believing the object may be a construction jig or possibly a pressure hull of a new submarine.

US intelligence detected a new submarine being built at Sinpo which was considered a likely successor to Sinpo-B (Gorae) and labelled it Sinpo-C with an estimated submerged mass of over 2,000 tons and with an 11-metre beam. 38 North also detected signs of submarine being built and reported satellite imagery from 5 November 2017 indicates a diameter of 7.1 metres.

Tokyo Shimbun reported in September 2017, that new North Korean submarine in construction to weigh 3,000 tons and have air-independent propulsion. Also in September 2017, Sekai Nippo also reported on the 3,000 ton submarine and added it is nuclear powered.

Also, the Sinpo-C ballistic missile submarine (SSB) and the Sinpo-class experimental ballistic missile submarine (SSBA) were built in the Sinpo South shipyard.

Chosun Ilbo reported on 5April 2019 that a 3,000 ton ballistic missile submarine is being built at Sinpo.

Satellite images of the Sinpo shipyard from March and April 2019 indicated that submarine construction is still ongoing.

3,000-ton submarine and 4,000–5,000-ton submarine
South Korean media has suggested that North Korea managed to reverse-engineer or modify one of the old Golf-II hulls that North Korea imported in the early 1990s. However, an  analysis in 38 North disagrees with the Golf-II conversion theory, as such a hull has yet to be identified.

Although a Type-033 submarine is the submarine being converted at the Sinpo South Shipyard, such a submarine, which originally weights 1830 tons is unlikely to become a 3000 ton submarine, by adding missile launch tubes and expanding the sail, as images released do not show the submarine being expanded in length. A Golf class submarine, however, would fit the description of a 3000 ton submarine, which is significantly larger than the Type-033 submarine that is the only known submarine undergoing reconstruction.

A different South Korean report claims that North Korea is also developing a larger submarine, at around 4000 to 5000 tons. This particular weight would fit the category of a nuclear submarine, which had been a stated goal by Kim Jong-un at the 8th Congress of the Workers' Party of Korea.

References

Submarines of the Korean People's Navy
Submarine classes